Naples is a small unincorporated community in Boundary County, in the far north of Idaho, United States. It is very close to the US-Canada border. The ZIP Code for Naples is 83847.

Naples is near the land features of Caribou Ridge and Ruby Creek. It resulted in the deaths of three people, including a deputy US marshal and two of the Weaver family.

It was named after the Italian city, from which many immigrant laborers had come who worked on building the first rail line through the region around 1890.

Geography

References

Italian-American culture
Unincorporated communities in Boundary County, Idaho
Unincorporated communities in Idaho